The Rhetoric of Reaction: Perversity, Futility, Jeopardy is a book by theorist Albert O. Hirschman, which styles the rhetoric of conservatism in opposition to social change as consisting of three narratives: perversity, futility, and jeopardy, and that, further, these narratives are simplistic and flawed, and cut off debate. After a historical examination of his thesis, he discusses corresponding progressive narratives, and proposes a new framework.

Hirschman takes as a starting point the neoconservative critiques of social security and other social welfare programs. Recalling Thomas Humphrey Marshall's theory of the development of citizenship in the West by which civil, political, and social dimensions of citizenship are successively achieved, Hirschman illustrates the rhetoric of reactionaries through citing arguments concerning three major reforms: the French revolution, moves toward universal suffrage in the 19th and 20th centuries, and the concerns over the welfare state in his time.

Reactionary narratives 
Hirschman describes the reactionary narratives thus:

 According to the perversity thesis, any purposive action to improve some feature of the political, social, or economic order only serves to exacerbate the condition one wishes to remedy (compare: Unintended consequences).
 The futility thesis holds that attempts at social transformation will be unavailing, that they will simply fail to "make a dent."
 Finally, the jeopardy thesis argues that the cost of the proposed change or reform is too high as it endangers some previous, precious accomplishment.

He argues that these are "rhetorics of intransigence", which do not further debate.

Progressive narratives 
In the final chapter, Hirschman discusses progressive narratives which he regards as simplistic and flawed.
 The Synergy Illusion – the idea that all reforms work together and reinforce each other, rather than being competing;
 The Imminent Danger – urgent action is necessary to avoid imminent danger;
 History Is on Our Side
Compare: "The arc of history is long, but it bends towards justice," by Martin Luther King Jr.

Proposal 
Hirschman advocates instead these "mature" bases for discussion:
 There are dangers and risks in both action and inaction. The risks of both should be canvassed, assessed, and guarded against to the extent possible.
 The baneful consequences of either action or inaction can never be known with certainty but our reaction to either is affected by the two types of alarm-sounding Cassandras with whom we have become acquainted.

Editions

References

1991 non-fiction books
Belknap Press books
Conservatism